Ossi Ikonen (born March 4, 1990) is a Finnish professional ice hockey defenceman. He is currently with Yertis Pavlodar of the Kazakhstan Hockey Championship.

Ikonen made his SM-liiga debut playing with JYP Jyväskylä during the 2011–12 SM-liiga season.

References

External links

1990 births
Living people
People from Toivakka
Finnish ice hockey defencemen
JYP Jyväskylä players
Yertis Pavlodar players
Beibarys Atyrau players
Sportspeople from Central Finland
21st-century Finnish people